The governor of Nebraska is the head of government of the U.S. state of Nebraska as provided by the fourth article of the Constitution of Nebraska. The officeholder is elected to a four-year term, with elections held two years after presidential elections. The governor may be elected any number of times, but not more than twice in a row. The current officeholder is Jim Pillen, a Republican, who was sworn in on January 5, 2023. The current Lieutenant Governor of Nebraska is Joe Kelly, who also assumed office on January 5, 2023.

Governors of Nebraska must be at least 30 years old and have been citizens and residents of the state for five years before being elected. Before 1966, the governor was elected to a two-year term. In 1962, a constitutional amendment extended the gubernatorial term to four years, effective with the 1966 election. In 1966, another amendment imposed a term limit of two consecutive terms. The lieutenant governor is subject to the same limitations and runs on a combined ticket with the governor. Charles W. Bryan is the only Governor of Nebraska to serve non-consecutive terms. Dave Heineman holds the record as Nebraska's longest-serving Governor with 10 years.

The governor's term, along with all other elected statewide officers, begins on the first Thursday after the first Tuesday in the month of January after an election. If the governor becomes incapacitated or is out of the state, the lieutenant governor acts as governor; if there is a vacancy or permanent incapacitation, the lieutenant governor becomes governor and serves the balance of the term. However, if both offices become vacant, the next person in the line of succession is the Speaker of the Nebraska Legislature, who is then followed by the chairs of various committees in the legislature.

Qualifications
Anyone who seeks to be elected Governor of Nebraska must meet the following qualifications:
Be at least 30 years old,
Be a resident of the state of Nebraska for at least five years, and
Be a citizen of the United States

Territorial governors
See List of governors of Missouri for the period from 1805 to 1821. Between 1821 and 1854, the land was unorganized territory.
Before statehood, governors were appointed to a four-year term by the President of the United States.

State governors

Popularly elected, beginning in 1866, to a two-year term. In 1962, the voters approved a constitutional amendment expanding terms beginning in 1966 to four years. In 1966, the voters limited the number of consecutive full terms that any one governor could serve to two (i.e. only one possible re-election while still in office after election to a full term.)

Notes

Succession

See also
List of Lieutenant Governors of Nebraska
United States congressional delegations from Nebraska
Political party strength in Nebraska

References

External links
Semi-Centennial History of Nebraska (1904)
Nebraska Blue Book
specifically (in the 2012-13 Blue Book), State Executive Branch (PDF), page 421, "Nebraska Governors, 1854–2013"

Lists of state governors of the United States
 
Governors